Gyldenpalm was a Danish and Norwegian noble family.

Hans Eilersen Hagerup was born 27 October 1717 in Kalundborg, Denmark and died 19 February 1781 at Kristiansand, Norway . He was the son of Eiler Hansen Hagerup (1685–1743) and Anna Catharina Barhow († 1737). His father was Bishop of the Diocese of Nidaros.

After a long career as an official, he became in 1761 General Commissioner of War in Nordland. This automatically gave him personal noble status, belonging to the office nobility (Norwegian: embetsadel, rangadel). On the 23rd of February 1781, four days after his death, he was ennobled under the name Gyldenpalm (lit. Golden Palm). This made also his children and grandchildren noble.

His son Eiler Hagerup Gyldenpalm (1740-1817) became the first to use the surname Gyldenpalm. His grandson, Hans Hagerup Gyldenpalm (1774-1827) was a theologian and nobleman. The family became patrilineally extinct with the death of his grandson, diplomat Andreas Dedekam Hagerup Gyldenpalm (1777–1832).

See also
 Danish nobility
 Norwegian nobility

References

Danish noble families
Norwegian families
Norwegian noble families
People from Kalundborg